Al Parker (born Andrew Robert Okun; June 25, 1952 – August 17, 1992) was a gay American porn star, producer, and director. He died from complications of AIDS at the age of 40.

Early career
Parker was born in Natick, Massachusetts.  After arriving in California, he was employed by Hugh Hefner at the Playboy Mansion West as a butler. His career in gay film started when he was "discovered" by Rip Colt, founder of Colt Studios. Colt gave him the performance name "Al Parker."

Parker began his filmmaking career when he signed with Brentwood Studios. He initially made short loop films shot on 8 mm reels.

Surge Studios
Parker was a producer, director, and actor. His company, Surge Studios, produced "theme" gay adult features, not just short loops. Many of the films were shot at Parker's home in Hermosa Beach, California. Surge Studios was one of the first studios to mandate safe sex practices when AIDS appeared.

Personal life
In 1969, Parker's mother encouraged him to attend the Woodstock Music Festival, believing that it was a classical music festival. After he was forced to abandon his mother's new car in the mud along the road leading to the festival, he encountered what he regarded as his first wholly satisfying sexual experience. His picture was taken there and appears on the poster collage for the Woodstock concert film released in 1970.

Parker was one of the interview subjects of Dr. Dean Edell, who reported a surgical procedure that sought to restore Parker's foreskin from his at-birth circumcision. The surgery was performed by Dr. Ira Sharlip, a urologist. The report was broadcast on television.

Death
Parker died in San Francisco. His remains were cremated and a memorial service was held at his private residence. His ashes were scattered in the ocean near the nude section of San Gregorio State Beach, San Mateo County, California.

Legacy
Parker is the subject of Roger Edmonson's biography Clone: The Life and Legacy of Al Parker Gay Superstar.

Parker's life is depicted in playwright Drew Sachs' play, aka Al Parker.

Selected filmography
 The Best of Al Parker (2008)
 Overload (1992)
 The Best of Colt Films: Part 10 (1991)
 Better than Ever (1989)
 Best of Brentwood 1 (1987)
 Turbo Charge (1987)
 The Best of Colt: Part 4 (1986)
 Oversize Load (1986) (director only, with a cameo appearance)
 High Tech (1986)
 Daddies Plaything (1985)
 Century Mining (1985)
 Hard Disk Drive (1985)
 Outrage (1984), aka Christopher Rage's Outrage (US)
 Headtrips (1984)
 One in a Billion (1984)
 Rangers (1984)
 Strange Places, Strange Things (1984)
 Therapy (1983)
 Weekend Lockup (1983)
 Dangerous (1983)
 A Few Good Men (1983)
 Games (1983)
 The Other Side of Aspen (1978)
 Turned On (1982)
 Flashbacks, aka Al Parker's Flashback (1981)
 Wanted (1980)
 Inches (1979)
 Best of Buckshot (Compilations) Chute, Timberwolves
 Heavy Equipment (1977) – shot in 3D

See also

 List of male performers in gay porn films
 Adult Erotic Gay Video Awards (Grabbys)
 Grabby recipients
 Discontinued gay pornography awards
 Gay Erotic Video Awards
 GayVN Awards
 List of gay porn movie studios
 List of gay porn magazines

References
Notes

Bibliography

External links

Review of Clone: The Life and Legacy of Al Parker
Retrieved 26 July 2017. Obituary.

1952 births
1992 deaths
American actors in gay pornographic films
American pornographic film directors
American pornographic film producers
LGBT film directors
American gay actors
LGBT people from Massachusetts
LGBT pornographic film actors
Gay pornographic film actors
People from Greater Boston
Male actors from San Francisco
Directors of gay pornographic films
AIDS-related deaths in California
Pornographic film actors from Massachusetts
Film directors from California
20th-century American male actors
20th-century American businesspeople
20th-century American LGBT people